Bromaghin Peak, at  above sea level is the fourth highest peak in the Smoky Mountains of Idaho. The peak is named for Captain Ralph Bromaghin, who was a member of the 10th Mountain Division and a Sun Valley ski instructor who died in World War II.

References 

Mountains of Idaho
Mountains of Blaine County, Idaho
Sawtooth National Forest